The Cayman Islands competed at the 2019 Pan American Games in Lima, Peru from July 26 to August 11, 2019.

The Cayman Islands Olympic Committee officially named the team of six athletes (four men and two women) competing in four sports (athletics, gymnastics, sailing and swimming) on June 28, 2019. The team also consisted of eight officials, coaches and managers.

During the opening ceremony of the games, sprinter Kemar Hyman carried the flag of the country as part of the parade of nations.

Competitors
The following is the list of number of competitors (per gender) participating at the games per sport/discipline.

Athletics (track and field)

Cayman Islands qualified one male track athlete.

Key
Note–Ranks given for track events are for the entire round

Men
Track event

Gymnastics

The Cayman Islands qualified one female artistic gymnast.

Artistic
Women
Individual Qualification

Sailing

The Cayman Islands received a universality spot in the men's laser event.

Men

Swimming

Cayman Islands qualified three swimmers (two men and one woman).

See also
Cayman Islands at the 2020 Summer Olympics

References

Nations at the 2019 Pan American Games
2019
2019 in Caymanian sport